Elks may refer to:

In organizations:
Benevolent and Protective Order of Elks, the American fraternal organization
Improved Benevolent and Protective Order of Elks of the World, historically African-American
Elks of Canada, its counterpart
The Elks, the Swedish national team in Aussie Football
The Edmonton Elks, a team in the Canadian Football League

In places:
Elks, Louisiana, an unincorporated community in the United States
West Elks AVA, Colorado wine region in Delta County

In computers:

Embeddable Linux Kernel Subset (ELKS), a Linux-like for Intel IA-16 architecture

See also
 List of Elks buildings
 Elx, another name of Elche, a town in Spain
 Elk (disambiguation)